The 1963 Florida A&M Rattlers football team was an American football team that represented Florida A&M University as a member of the Southern Intercollegiate Athletic Conference (SIAC) during the 1963 NCAA College  Division football season. The team played its home games at Bragg Memorial Stadium in Tallahassee, Florida.

The team's statistical leaders included Bobby Felts with 657 rushing yards and 68 points scored, Jim Tullis with 1,172 passing yards, and Al Denson with 564 receiving yards. Bobby Felts and Bob Hayes tied for the team lead with 11 touchdowns each.

Schedule

References

Florida AandM
Florida A&M Rattlers football seasons
Florida AandM Rattlers football